Eja or EJA may refer to:

Scholarly journals 
 East Journal on Approximations
 European Journal of Anaesthesiology
 European Journal of Archaeology

Other uses 
 Eja (born 1972), Malaysian actress
 Ejamat language
 European Juggling Association
 NetJets, an American jet charter company
 Yariguíes Airport, in Colombia